This is a list of notable events in country music that took place in the year 1954.

Events 
 January 4 — Elvis Presley records a 10-inch acetate demo at the Memphis Recording Studio; the two songs are "Casual Love Affair" and "I'll Never Stand In Your Way".
 February 20 — "Slowly" by Webb Pierce becomes the first No. 1 song on Billboards country charts to feature the pedal steel guitar.
 June 19 — Top recording  "I Don't Hurt Anymore" by Hank Snow begins 20-week run at #1 on Best Seller list. "One by One" by Red Foley and Kitty Wells begins 21-week run at #2 on same chart, spending a single week at No. 1 later in the year. For most of the summer and fall, "I Don't Hurt Anymore" holds "One By One" out of the top spot.
 July 17 — Ozark Jubilee debuts (on radio) as a weekly live broadcast over KWTO-AM. On August 7, ABC Radio begins carrying 25 minutes of the program nationally, hosted by Red Foley.
 July 6 — Elvis Presley releases his first single, "That's All Right"/"Blue Moon of Kentucky". A month later, Billboard gives the song a positive review, with the reviewer calling Presley a "strong new talent," and by September is a No. 1 hit in Memphis.
 October 2 — Elvis Presley makes his one and only appearance on the Grand Ole Opry. Two weeks later, debuted on the Louisiana Hayride and is soon making regular appearances.
 November 13 — A Billboard disc jockey poll reports that disc jockeys are playing 11 percent country on radio stations, compared to 42 percent pop and 5 percent rhythm and blues.
 November 20 — Bartenders in Hammond, Indiana request that disc jockeys at WJOB radio stop playing Ferlin Husky's "The Drunken Driver", about an intoxicated driver who causes a crash that kills two children; the song "is hurting business," the union claimed.

No dates
 The 45 RPM vinyl record has all but taken over, both at the radio station and in stores. Few disc jockeys are still playing 78 RPM records (save for oldies).
 Elvis Presley makes his first Sun Records recordings in Memphis, Tennessee. His 1954 releases are only regional hits. Presley was one of several artists who make their earliest recordings for Sun Records. Late in the year, Johnny Cash records two songs he wrote, "Wide Open Road" and "You're My Baby".
After a string of minor successes with singles and 10" vinyl records, RCA Victor releases Chet Atkins' first LP, A Session with Chet Atkins.
 George Jones and Johnny Cash make their debuts.

Top hits of the year

Number one hits

United States
(as certified by Billboard)

Notes
1^ No. 1 song of the year, as determined by Billboard.
2^ Song dropped from No. 1 and later returned to top spot.
A^ Only Billboard No. 1 hit for that artist.Note''''': Several songs were simultaneous No. 1 hits on the separate "Most Played in Juke Boxes," "Most Played by Jockeys" and "Best Sellers in Stores" charts.

Other major hits

Births 
 April 29 — Karen Brooks, female vocalist best known for her No. 1 duet with T.G. Sheppard, "Fakin' Love."
 July 13 -- Louise Mandrell, female vocalist/musician. Was part of the Barbara Mandrell and the Mandrell sisters TV show on NBC 80-82. Had a series of country albums and hits 70's and 80's. Starred in her own theater for 8 years in Pigeon Forge TN. 
 July 18 — Ricky Skaggs, artist who fused bluegrass and contemporary country sounds in the 1980s.
 October 30 — T. Graham Brown, blues-styled country artist of the 1980s.
 October 30 — Jeannie Kendall, daughter half of The Kendalls.
 December 13 — John Anderson, honky tonk-styled singer since the early 1980s.
 December 25 — Steve Wariner, singer-songwriter and guitarist since the early 1980s.

Deaths 
 December 1 — Fred Rose, 56, songwriter and founder of Acuff-Rose Music. One of the first three inductees into the Country Music Hall of Fame.

References

Further reading 
 Kingsbury, Paul, "Vinyl Hayride: Country Music Album Covers 1947–1989," Country Music Foundation, 2003
 Millard, Bob, "Country Music: 70 Years of America's Favorite Music," HarperCollins, New York, 1993
 Whitburn, Joel. "Top Country Songs 1944–2005 – 6th Edition." 2005.

Country
Country music by year